Tristram Roger Dymoke Powell (born 25 April 1940) is an English television and film director, producer and screenwriter. His credits include American Friends, episodes of series five and six of Foyle's War, and adaptations of the novels The Ghost Writer and Falling.

Life
Powell was born in Oxford, the elder son of the novelist Anthony Powell and Lady Violet Powell (née Pakenham). His godfather was Robert Wyndham Ketton-Cremer, the last squire of Felbrigg Hall and a noted biographer. He was educated at Eton College and Trinity College, Oxford.

Tristram Powell's father died in 2000, and he has recounted the story of his conversing with the doctor in attendance, who was also surnamed Powell, about his ancestry. His mother, Lady Violet, died in 2002.

Powell objected to the National Trust's 2017 short film about his godfather, Robert Wyndham Ketton-Cremer of Felbrigg Hall, in which the latter's private life as a homosexual was revealed. Powell said that the Trust had made the revelation for "commercial reasons" in a way he considered "exaggerated and mean-spirited".

Powell's daughter Georgia married Henry Somerset, 12th Duke of Beaufort, in 2018.

Filmography

Director

References

External links
 

1940 births
People educated at Eton College
English television directors
People from Oxford
Living people
English television writers